Sir William Macleod Bannatyne, Lord Bannatyne FRSE (26 January 1743 – 30 November 1833) was a distinguished Scottish advocate, judge, antiquarian and historian.

Life
The son of Mr. Roderick Macleod, writer to the signet and Isabel (fl. 1736–1744), daughter of Hector Bannatyne of Kames. He received a liberal education, including a period at the High School of Edinburgh (1755-6), and was admitted advocate, 22 January 1765. He was appointed Sheriff of Bute in 1776. On the death of Lord Swinton, in 1799, he was promoted to the bench, and took his seat as Lord Bannatyne.

Among his intimate friends were Henry Mackenzie, Robert Cullen, William Craig, Hugh Blair, Erskine and Alexander Abercromby. He was a member of the Mirror Club and Lounger Club, at the end of the eighteenth century.

In 1784 he was a co-founder of the Highland Society.

He assumed the name of Bannatyne when he succeeded, through his mother to the estate of Kames in the Isle of Bute. He extended Kames Castle by the addition of a fine mansion house in the early eighteenth century. He sold the Kames estate in 1812 to James Hamilton, and moved to Edinburgh.

He retired in 1823, when he was knighted. He died at his home, Whitefoord House on the Canongate section of the Royal Mile in Edinburgh in 1833. He is buried in Greyfriars Kirkyard in the centre of Edinburgh.

He collected a library of historical, genealogical, and antiquarian works, and at its sale in 1834, a set of the Bannatyne publications was purchased for Sir John Hay, Baronet of Smithfield and Haystown, for one hundred and sixty-eight pounds sterling.

See also
Bannatyne manuscript (Clan MacLeod), attributed to William Bannatyne, Lord Bannatyne

References

1743 births
1833 deaths
Lawyers from Edinburgh
People educated at the Royal High School, Edinburgh
Members of the Faculty of Advocates
Bannatyne
Scottish knights
18th-century Scottish judges
19th-century Scottish judges
18th-century Scottish historians
19th-century Scottish historians
Scottish antiquarians
Scottish sheriffs
Founder Fellows of the Royal Society of Edinburgh
Burials at Greyfriars Kirkyard